The library system of Tufts University (Tufts Libraries) covers all academic departments comprising the university. The main library is Tisch Library, which holds about 2.5 million volumes, with other holdings dispersed at subject libraries.

History
Tufts' library was established in 1850 with a gift of seven volumes, three years before classes began. The collection moved from building to building on the academic quad until in 1908, Tufts' first library building, Eaton Memorial Library (now Eaton Hall), was made possible with a donation from Andrew Carnegie. Carnegie's wife requested that the building be named after a Tufts graduate, Reverend Charles Eaton, who had presided over her wedding. 

The building received an extension in 1950 with the construction of the War Memorial Library in honor of the Tufts alumni who served in World War II. By 1965 the collection outgrew the building and was moved to a new main library named Wessell Library. Additionally the demand for more square footage prompted the expansion of Wessell.

Smaller libraries
In addition to the main library, there are a few smaller libraries that serve specialized fields:
Edward Ginn Library – provides collections and services for the Fletcher School. It is one of the largest specialized libraries in the field of international affairs. The collection holds over 120,000 volumes. 
Hirsh Health Sciences Library – provides resources for the School of Medicine, School of Dental Medicine, Friedman School of Nutrition Science and Policy, the Sackler School of Graduate Biomedical Sciences and the HNRCA. The library has been operating since the 1960s, and was rededicated in 2005 as the Hirsh Health Sciences Library. 
Webster Family Library of Veterinary Medicine – located on the Grafton campus, supports the clinical programs of both the Large Animal Hospital and the Foster Hospital for Small Animals, as well as the informational needs of the students in the Doctor of Veterinary Medicine (DVM), Master’s and PhD programs.

List of Tufts Libraries 
Tufts Archival Research Center
Edward Ginn Library
Hirsh Health Sciences Library
Lilly Music Library
Tisch Library
W. Van Alan Clark, Jr. Library
Webster Family Library

References

Tufts University